The Salton Sink is the low point of an endorheic basin, a closed drainage system with no outflows to other bodies of water, in the Colorado Desert sub-region of the Sonoran Desert. The sink falls within the larger Salton Trough and separates the Coachella Valley from the Imperial Valley, which are also segments of the Salton Trough.

Geology
The Salton Sink is the topographic low area within the Salton Trough, an active tectonic pull-apart basin. The Salton Trough is a result of crustal stretching and sinking by the combined actions of the San Andreas Fault and the East Pacific Rise. The Brawley seismic zone forms the southeast end of the basin and connects the San Andreas Fault system with the Imperial Fault Zone to the south. The Salton Buttes are rhyolite lava domes within the basin which were active 10,300 (± 1000) years BP.

History
A large lake, Lake Cahuilla, existed in the area from about 20,500 to 3,000 years ago and left evidence as wave-cut benches on the higher portions of the Salton Buttes. A beach mark outlines the shoreline of ancient Lake Cahuilla where archeologists found rockfish traps and charred remains of razorback sucker and bonytail bones.

In 1884 and 1891 the Colorado River had escapement flow into the Salton Sink.
A larger 1905 Colorado flood escaped into a diversion canal, forming the Alamo and New Rivers and creating the current Salton Sea in the sink's Coachella Valley.  A 1907 dam prevents flood escapements, but leakage still occurs to the Salton Sea.

View

References

Endorheic basins of the United States
Geography of the Colorado Desert
Geography of Imperial County, California
Geography of Riverside County, California
Coachella Valley
Imperial Valley
Salton Sea
Salton Trough
Geology of Imperial County, California
Geology of Riverside County, California